Yuri Vadimovich Prokhorov (born 11 November 1991) is a Russian luger.

He participated at the 2019 FIL World Luge Championships, winning a medal.

References

External links
 
 
 

1991 births
Living people
Russian male lugers
Olympic lugers of Russia
Lugers at the 2022 Winter Olympics
Sportspeople from Moscow Oblast